The Arawhata River (often spelt with the Ngāi Tahu Māori dialect spelling Arawata River) is in the West Coast region of the South Island of New Zealand.

The river has its headwaters in the Mount Aspiring National Park. A small lake, Lake Ellery, drains into the river near its mouth, via a short tributary, the Jackson River.

Access is possible up the river by jetboat.  Access to the glaciers, forests and flats of the upper reaches of the valley is restricted by Ten Hour Gorge. Glacial silt in the river imparts an opaque green to greyish coloration to the water. The lower valley is grazed by cattle by the local farmers under a grazing licence.  The majority of the land in the area is publicly owned and administered by the Department of Conservation.

Owing to the high rainfall on the western side of the Southern Alps, the river level can rapidly rise.

Reference 

Westland District
Rivers of the West Coast, New Zealand
Rivers of New Zealand